Down in the Valley may refer to:

 "Down in the Valley" (folk song) ("Birmingham Jail"), American folk song
 Down in the Valley (film), film directed by David Jacobson (2005)
 Down in the Valley (opera), Kurt Weill opera (1948)
 "Down in the Valley" (Solomon Burke song), rhythm and blues song (1962)
 "Down in the Valley" (Squeeze song), rock single (1998)
 Down in the Valley: Barn Aid Benefit Concert, live album (2001) 
 Down in the Valley (album), album by The Handsome Family